Radio Vlasenica or Радио Власеница is a Bosnian local public radio station, broadcasting from Vlasenica, Bosnia and Herzegovina.

It was launched on 20 April 2020 as local/municipal radio station. Radio station broadcasts a variety of programs such as local news, music, sport and talk shows. Program is mainly produced in Serbian language

Estimated number of potential listeners of Radio Vlasenica is around 28.233. Radio station is also available in municipalities of Podrinje area and in neighboring Serbia.

Frequencies
 Vlasenica

See also 
 List of radio stations in Bosnia and Herzegovina
 Radio Višegrad
 Radio Goražde

References

External links 
 www.fmscan.org
 www.radiovlasenica.com
 www.opstinavlasenica.org
 Communications Regulatory Agency of Bosnia and Herzegovina

Vlasenica
Radio stations established in 2020
Vlasenica